Vinod Dham is an Indian-American engineer, entrepreneur and venture capitalist. He is known as 'Father of the Pentium Chip' for his contribution to the development of Intel's Pentium micro-processor He is a mentor, advisor and sits on the boards of companies, including startups funded through his India-based fund Indo-US Venture Partners, where he is the founding managing director.

Vinod Dham's accomplishment as 'Pentium Engineer' and as an Indian-American technology pioneer from Silicon Valley was observed at an exhibition on South Asians in National Museum of Natural History at the Smithsonian in Washington, D.C., highlighting Indian-Americans who have helped shape America.

Early life
Vinod Dham was born in the 1950s in Pune, India. His father was a member of the army civilian department who had moved from Rawalpindi, Punjab, Pakistan, to India during the Partition of India. 

Dham graduated with BE degree in Electrical Engineering from Delhi College of Engineering in 1971 at the age of 21. At the age of 25, he left his family in Delhi, India, to study for MS degree in Physics (Solid State) in the US, arriving with just $8 in his pocket. 

He is married to Sadhana and has two sons. He has three brothers and a sister.

Career
After completing a BE degree in Electrical Engineering in 1971, Dahm joined Delhi-based semiconductor manufacturer Continental Devices, one of India's only private silicon semiconductor start-ups at the time which collaborated with Teradyne Semiconductor Company, USA. He was a part of the early team that put together a facility in Delhi where he worked for four years. It was while he worked at this company that his love for semiconductors bloomed. He found it to be an exciting field because it applied the knowledge he had learned as an engineer with his developing interests in understanding the physics behind the behavior of semiconductor devices.

In 1975, he left this job and went to the University of Cincinnati, in Ohio, to pursue an MS degree in Physics (Solid-State). After completing his MS degree in 1977, he joined NCR Corporation, in Dayton, Ohio, as an engineer. He did did cutting-edge work in developing advanced non-volatile memories while there. Joining NCR was not a planned career move though. At the University of Cincinnati, when NCR needed help, Dham was the student in his class who had worked the longest in semi-conductors. His leading-edge work on non-volatile memories helped NCR get a patent in 1985 on mixed dielectric process and non-volatile memory device.

He then joined Intel Corporation as an engineer, where he led the development of the world-famous Pentium processor. He is called the "Pentium Engineer" for his role in the development of the Pentium Micro-Processor. He is also one of the co-inventors of Intel's first Flash Memory Technology (ETOX). He rose to the position of Vice President of Micro-Processor Group at Intel.

During a presentation of his work on non-volatile memory for the NCR Microelectronics at an IEEE workshop, he was approached by Intel and in 1979 joined Intel as engineer, where he worked with the non-volatile memory team and was one of the co-inventor of Intel's first flash memory (ETOX). He later moved to the micro-processor division where he honed his skills for leading the Pentium project by working on two earlier generations of micro-processors—Intel's 386 and 486—in various capacities. In the 1980s, PCs had become mainstream tools for productivity enhancement at the workplace. By the time he started the Pentium project, many established and new players, including AIM consortium (led by Apple, IBM and Motorola) and ACE (Advanced Computing Environment) consortium formed in 1991 and led by Compaq, Microsoft, DEC, and MIPS Technologies, and a consortium by Sun Microsystems (which comprised Sun, Fujitsu, Philips, Tatung and Amdahl) using superior RISC (Reduced Instruction Set Computing) had all begun aggressively working on their big idea for PC industry and these projects seriously threatened Intel's dominance in segment. Dham believes that Intel's ability to 'focus and execute' while maintaining full compatibility of the application with its previous generation micro-processors was the key reason for its success over dozens of these big competitors. In a Business Week cover story on Intel's new processors, Dham was quoted as General Manager of the 586 processor group (586 was the internal name for the project until it was named 'Pentium' at launch).

He left Intel in 1995 and joined the startup NexGen, which was subsequently acquired by AMD. Dham played an instrumental role in the launch of K6—the "Pentium killer" processor at rival AMD Co. He held the vice president position of AMD's Computation Products Group. He then went on to lead a nascent startup, Silicon Spice in April 1998, which he re-directed to build a VOIP chip and sold it to Broadcom in 2000. He then launched an incubator NewPath Ventures, where he co-founded companies with an objective of using India's emerging talent in chip design for R&D. He is currently Managing Director and founder of Indo-US Venture Partners, an early stage India focused fund that he founded after NewPath. Dham has over the years been a board member and technical advisor to dozens of private and public companies the worldover.

In February 2015, Dham announced his return to entrepreneurship as the co-founder and CEO of Acadgild, an online educational platform he co-founded with Indian entrepreneur duo-Krishnan Ganesh and Meena Ganesh of Tutorvista. Acadgild aims to teach just about anybody, including a Class 10 student, software programming that is relevant to today's rapidly evolving digital world. Unlike many existing online courses that rely on videos, Acadgild provides live mentoring and hands-on engagement for building real applications for its students. It will also include building two applications, thus preparing the students with job-ready skills and a more effective way for their perspective employers to evaluate them.

Entrepreneurial career

NexGen
When Dham had joined Intel, it had  $1 million revenue. By the time he left in 1995, Intel's revenues had soared to US$16.2 billion. Dham said he was a keen observer of how Andy Grove built strategy and organisation for Intel's success in the micro-processor business. At Intel, Dham made a decision to work on processors when he decided to leave R&D. By the time he left Intel, his achievements reached a great prominence. It was also the time when entrepreneurial revolution in Silicon Valley was at its peak. He came across a company NexGen, a boutique processor design company that was eight years old, and joined as COO. Design Engineering team at NexGen proved itself to be very capable but the company did not have a chip that was bus-compatible with the Pentium, an important functionality that was needed to fit in PC industry dominated by Intel. Dham, with his wide-ranging experience, did changes in NexGen's strategy knowing that NexGen had to license intellectual property (IP) that would piggyback on infrastructure that had already been created by the rest of PC industry and needed access to manufacturing capabilities and advanced technology by partnering with established players for building its chips competitively with Intel's.

While looking for right partner for NexGen, Dham discovered that Advance Micro Devices (AMD) Inc. was Intel's main competitor in the computer hardware industry but its micro-processor product, K5, that has been positioned to be response to Intel's Pentium Processor, had failed to deliver on its promise. Dham convinced the NexGen management to explore what appeared to be a perfect synergy for merging the two companies-NexGen had a product but no factories and process technology, whereas AMD had a factory and advanced technology but no product. His insights proved right and AMD acquired NexGen's product and process technology for $857 million. AMD's next product, K6, was built using NexGen's core technology. For a short while, it was the fastest processor in the world. It was the first time ever anybody beat Intel at its own speed game. The success of K6 was critical from one more angle: microprocessors were expensive which meant that PCs had to be sold for over $1500. AMD, under Dham's leadership of the micro-processor business, priced K6 to create a PC below $1000. AMD's ability to give relevant competition to Intel and create a sub-$1000 PC played a key role in creating a sub-$1000 category for the first time. This positioning forced Intel to respond initially with a truncated Pentium under the brand name Celeron. (These days desktop computers priced at less than $300.) After spending a year at AMD, post-acquisition of NexGen, Dham joined another startup in April 1998—Silicon Spice as CEO and president

Silicon Spice

Dham, who had made a career out of micro-processors, was no longer interested in just chips, which form the guts and brains of PC. Rather, he was preaching a new mantra:  communications processors. "The microprocessor business had become less interesting business to me," he said. In his opinion, the Internet was the mother of all killer applications, which could use most computing power if there were no connectivity bottleneck. Anyone who could help unclog this bottleneck, would hold the key to a multi-billion-dollar bounty. "The PC was designed for computing, and not for communication. The micro-processor has gone beyond its use," he said. In other words, hardware is far ahead of the current computing requirements" he said. With demand for communications-related chips then growing at 20% per annum, Dham and Silicon Spice's three MIT-graduate co-founders wanted a piece of the pie. Silicon Spice raised more than $34 Million in VC funding from New Enterprise Associates and Kleiner, Perkins, Caufield & Byers.

Silicon Spice was initially experimenting using an innovative reconfigurable technology to design chips. It turned out that the chips designed in this fashion lacked the necessary performance and cost to be of much commercial use. Meanwhile, Er. Ing. Dham learnt from dealing with several customers that there was an emerging need for developing chips that could effectively transfer voice over the Internet. Dham explains, "The Internet protocol was being used mainly for data and delivering voice over Internet, which was designed primarily for data transfer and was a tricky problem in terms of technology". Dham re-directed the company to build this new chip to support VoIP (Voice over Internet Protocol), among the first in world at that time. Silicon Spice's technology was promising. In a little over two years (in August 2000), Er.Ing. Dham sold Silicon Spice to Broadcom for $1.2 billion in an all-stock deal. The deal was Broadcom's largest ever (at the time of acquisition) and its seventh acquisition in the year 2000. Broadcom's former CEO Henry Nicholas said that Silicon Spice's architecture for communications processors, which enables banks of chips to be replaced with a single piece of silicon, is Broadcom's most strategic buy yet and opens a 'multi-billion-dollar' opportunity. "This is kind of the holy grail of carrier-class communication equipment," Nicholas said. "What Silicon Spice has created is a whole new computational element of same significance of what micro-processor was to PC." "One of the biggest lessons I learnt was that it always helps to start defining your product with very early involvement with customers, "said Dham. (Ref: Smart CEO 15 Jan 2011)

Mentor and venture capitalist
In December 2001, Dham made a trip to India where he met several businesses. He was impressed by the success of India's IT industry based on off-shoring of US software development to India and was wondering what it would take to recreate a similar USIndia model for hardware and chip design off shoring to India. With seed capital from other venture capitalists in April 2002, he co-founded an incubator New Path Ventures. It invested in Chip and System Design Companies like Telsima (WiMAX chips), Montalvo Systems (low-power chips) and in Silica (chips for multimedia and digital printing processors) and Nevis (secure networking) with development teams in India for markets in U.S. The timing was right, with Silicon Valley looking at reducing expenditure in chip development space. Dham, with his partner, was extremely hands on in helping these Companies in their day-to-day operations. However the experience highlighted that with so much focus on software India had not yet developed the critical mass of skills for chip design work and speciality software expertise to support the 'offshoring' model. These start ups were subsequently acquired. 
Having learnt that opportunities for venture backed startups in India will likely revolve more around services required to meet needs of India's growing consumer class, Dham subsequently co-founded NEA-a Indo-US Ventures, a cross-border, India-focused fund in 2006. Firm was later re-branded Indo-US Venture Partners. Currently, Dham runs IUVP with his two Bengaluru, Indiabased investment partners. IUVP's focus has been on investing in Indian companies across sectors including Mobile Technology; knowledge process outsourcing; Internet; Education and HealthCare.

Philanthropy
Dham and his wife Sadhana are donors to many charities in the US and India. He has been a trustee of the American India Foundation (AIF) since 2001. Former president Bill Clinton serves as the honorary chair. In July 2006, he was named to Board of Directors and was appointed Chair of the Digital Equalizer (DE) Program with a mission to provide underprivileged children in India with the opportunity to enhance their learning through use of digital technology in a scalable and sustainable manner. As Chair of the DE Program, he led the program's strategic direction and growth. He has been actively involved in the fund-raising and was awarded the Visionary Award for his DE work by Montek Singh Ahluwaliain 2010.

Recognition
In 1993, Dham was named one of the Top 25 Executives in the US Computer Industry. In 1999, he was named one of the top 100 Most Influential Asian Americans of the decade. In 2000,he was appointed to serve on the President's Advisory Commission on Asian Americans and Pacific Islanders by President Bill Clinton.

On 1 January, India's magazine India Today listed Dham among the Global Indian Achievers. Dham said, the survival instinct is the critical factor underlying the success of Indians in Silicon Valley.

Dham was profiled at the Pravasi Bhartiya Diwas in 2007, organised by the Ministry of Overseas Affairs of the government of India, a high recognition for accomplished Indians including Amar Bose, Indra Nooyi, Vinod Khosla, Arun Sarin, Lakshmi Mittal.

Dham was profiled by India Abroad among 50 Most Influential Indian Americans.

Dham was also profiled by China Daily BBS along with JC Bose, Amar Bose, Subrahmanyan Chandrasekhar and others.

Scribd profiled Dham amongst great Indians of this Century and contributing today.

Dham was awarded the NRI Achievement Award at the NRI Global Summit in Oct 2009 by the NRI institute, a New Delhibased nonprofit. NRI Institute has a nearly 30-year history of recognizing Pravasi (non-resident) such as Sam Pitroda, Chairman of India's National Knowledge Commission, Lord Swaraj Paul, British Parliamentarian and Founder of Caparo Group, and Baron Karan Bilimoria of Cobra Beer.

Dham was profiled among the first and notable Indian American Achievers by the Asian Pacific American Program established HomeSpun:Smithsonian Indian American Heritage Project, which will chronicle the story of immigrants from India and their descendants in America

On 22 April 2011, Dham was given People Choice Award and Special Jury Award in the category of Science and Technology by Times of India Group's 'Light of India Awards', recognizing Indian achievers abroad.

On 13 November 2014, Dham was honored with 'Lifetime Accomplishments Award' by VC Taskforce, a Silicon Valley-based organization boasting 6000 members dedicated to promoting innovation through Venture Community.

Quotes
"The best thing that happened to me was joining Intel and the best thing that happened to me was leaving Intel."
 "Electrons move at the same speed whether at Intel or AMD."
 "You know, if you are here in Silicon Valley 10 to 15 years and you have not stepped out and done a startup, there's something wrong with you."
 "Speed was God for us when we designed Pentium. All we did was to build the fastest BMW or Lamborghini equivalent of a chip, and you were a hero. Now, its more like building an efficient Prius or a Nano. It may not go very fast but consumes less power. A total paradigm shift has occurred in the chip industry. It is evident with the ARM chips, being used to build new devices. These chips may not run as fast but they can run your iPad or netbook for weeks. That wasn't the case in the 80s and 90s."
"To stay globally competitive the nation must do better at steering its youth toward engineering careers". Vinod Dham is among a growing number of technology executives warning that the U.S. faces an Engineer shortage.
"More and more, Sand Hill Road (a key location for VCs in Silicon Valley) money is moving to India. It's clear India's time has come."
Dham on cell phones usage and its future: "There is nothing except maybe Excel spreadsheets that you can't do on a cell phone. You can do mails, SMS, MMS. You can do photo sharing. You can find the nearest restaurant. You can't do the latter on a laptop. It's a far richer medium. You will see a lot of big screens in the home and a cell phone won't compete with that. But the ubiquitous device that you won't leave home without is the cell phone. In India, when they're fishing, they call back and say how many pounds of fish they caught and when they will be back. That creates a real-time market with buyers."

References

External links

 Real World Tech

1950 births
AMD people
20th-century Indian inventors
Indian emigrants to the United States
Intel people
Living people
American people of Punjabi descent
Engineers from Maharashtra
Delhi University alumni
Delhi Technological University alumni
University of Cincinnati alumni
20th-century Indian engineers
Indian computer scientists
Scientists from Pune
Indian venture capitalists